Aidi bin Moktar is a Malaysian politician who has been the State Minister of Law and Native Affairs. He served as the Member of Sabah State Legislative Assembly (MLA) for Pantai Manis from May 2018 until September 2020. He is a member of the Sabah Heritage Party (WARISAN).

Election results

References

Malaysian politicians
Living people
Year of birth missing (living people)